Georges Leygues (29 October 1856 – 2 September 1933) was a French politician of the Third Republic.  During his time as Minister of Marine he worked with the navy's chief of staff Henri Salaun in unsuccessful attempts to gain naval re-armament priority for government funding over army rearmament such as the Maginot Line.

Leygues's Ministry, 24 September 1920 – 16 January 1921
Georges Leygues – President of the Council of Ministers and Minister of Foreign Affairs
André Joseph Lefèvre – Minister of War
Théodore Steeg – Minister of the Interior
Frédéric François-Marsal – Minister of Finance
Paul Jourdain – Minister of Labour
Gustave L'Hopiteau – Minister of Justice
Adolphe Landry – Minister of Marine
André Honnorat – Minister of Public Instruction and Fine Arts
André Maginot – Minister of War Pensions, Grants, and Allowances
Joseph Ricard – Minister of Agriculture
Albert Sarraut – Minister of Colonies
Yves Le Trocquer – Minister of Public Works
Auguste Isaac – Minister of Commerce and Industry
Émile Ogier – Minister of Liberated Regions

Changes
16 December 1920 – Flaminius Raiberti succeeds Lefèvre as Minister of War.

Memory
Two French warships have been named for Georges Leygues:
 a light cruiser Georges Leygues that served in World War II
 an F70-type frigate Georges Leygues in current service

References

External links
 

1856 births
1933 deaths
People from Villeneuve-sur-Lot
Politicians from Nouvelle-Aquitaine
Democratic Republican Alliance politicians
Prime Ministers of France
Ministers of Marine
French Ministers of Overseas France
French interior ministers
Members of the 4th Chamber of Deputies of the French Third Republic
Members of the 5th Chamber of Deputies of the French Third Republic
Members of the 6th Chamber of Deputies of the French Third Republic
Members of the 7th Chamber of Deputies of the French Third Republic
Members of the 8th Chamber of Deputies of the French Third Republic
Members of the 9th Chamber of Deputies of the French Third Republic
Members of the 10th Chamber of Deputies of the French Third Republic
Members of the 11th Chamber of Deputies of the French Third Republic
Members of the 12th Chamber of Deputies of the French Third Republic
Members of the 13th Chamber of Deputies of the French Third Republic
Members of the 14th Chamber of Deputies of the French Third Republic
Members of the 15th Chamber of Deputies of the French Third Republic